Frits Smol (6 July 1924 – 1 November 2006) was a Dutch water polo player who won a European title in 1950. He competed in the 1948 and 1952 Summer Olympics and won a bronze medal in 1948, placing fifth in 1952. He was the second best Dutch player at those games after Ruud van Feggelen, scoring ten goal in 1948 and eight goals in 1952.

See also
 List of Olympic medalists in water polo (men)

References

External links
 

1924 births
2006 deaths
Dutch male water polo players
Olympic bronze medalists for the Netherlands in water polo
Water polo players at the 1948 Summer Olympics
Medalists at the 1948 Summer Olympics
Water polo players at the 1952 Summer Olympics
Sportspeople from The Hague
20th-century Dutch people